Reamstown (Pennsylvania Dutch: Riemeschteddel) is an unincorporated community and census-designated place (CDP) in Lancaster County, Pennsylvania. The population was 3,361 at the 2010 census.

Geography
Reamstown is located in northeastern Lancaster County at  (40.212046, -76.117587), in the southern part of East Cocalico Township. It is bordered to the northwest by the borough of Denver.

Pennsylvania Route 272 passes through the community north of the downtown section. PA 272 leads northeast  to Adamstown and southwest the same distance to Ephrata.

Cocalico Creek runs along the northwest edge of the CDP, flowing southwest to the Conestoga River, which continues southwest to the Susquehanna.

History 
The town was named after Eberhard Ream (Johann Eberhardt Riehm 1687–1779), whose son, Tobias Ream, founded it in the 1740s. It was originally known as "Zohar."

During the American Revolution, Reamstown served as one of a number of field hospitals for the wounded following the Battle of Brandywine on September 11, 1777. A dozen or more of these troops died here and are buried in unmarked graves in the Salem Evangelical Cemetery. The cemetery is also home to a large boulder that once served as a mortar and pestle by the native people who lived on nearby Ephrata Mountain to the south. It was transported to Reamstown by Pierce Lesher, and today a plaque on the stone details both the Native American and military history.

Demographics
As of the census of 2000, there were 3,498 people, 1,161 households, and 897 families living in the CDP. The population density was 1,542.0 people per square mile (595.0/km). There were 1,194 housing units at an average density of 526.3/sq mi (203.1/km). The racial makeup of the CDP was 95.23% White, 0.31% African American, 0.26% Native American, 2.23% Asian, 0.03% Pacific Islander, 0.80% from other races, and 1.14% from two or more races. Hispanic or Latino of any race were 1.92% of the population.

There were 1,161 households, out of which 41.6% had children under the age of 18 living with them, 67.9% were married couples living together, 6.1% had a female householder with no husband present, and 22.7% were non-families. 18.1% of all households were made up of individuals, and 6.5% had someone living alone who was 65 years of age or older. The average household size was 2.85 and the average family size was 3.25.

In the CDP, the population was spread out, with 28.6% under the age of 18, 6.0% from 18 to 24, 33.3% from 25 to 44, 19.8% from 45 to 64, and 12.3% who were 65 years of age or older. The median age was 36 years. For every 100 females, there were 99.7 males. For every 100 females age 18 and over, there were 97.6 males.

The median income for a household in the CDP was $53,423, and the median income for a family was $58,625. Males had a median income of $40,516 versus $25,625 for females. The per capita income for the CDP was $21,143. About 3.3% of families and 5.5% of the population were below the poverty line, including 9.1% of those under age 18 and 4.8% of those age 65 or over.

Notable people 
 George S. Howard, founding commander and conductor of the United States Air Force band in 1947
Bryan P. Smith, United States Military Academy graduate, veteran of Operation Iraqi Freedom 06–08, 09–10. Executive in the Oil and Gas industry.

References

Census-designated places in Lancaster County, Pennsylvania
Census-designated places in Pennsylvania